Itch is an Australian children's action-adventure television series which premiered on ABC iView on 31 December 2019 and ABC Me on 15 January 2020. The two ten-part action adventure series is based on the books written by Simon Mayo. It is directed by Renée Webster, Nicholas Verso and Tenika Smith. The show was renewed for a second series in October 2020 which premiered on ABC ME and ABC iview on 17 September 2021.

The first series was shot in Albany and Perth, Western Australia between February and April 2019 and the second series was filmed in the Albany, Peel region and Perth, Western Australia between October and December 2020.

Plot
Itchingham Lofte loves science, especially chemistry. He is also an element hunter: he is collecting all the elements in the periodic table, which leads him to conduct sometimes destructive experiments in his bedroom. Itch obtains a rock which he believes is a new element and has strange properties. At first no one believes him, but soon various people – all connected to the powerful GreenCorp – are chasing after the strange new rock. Itch and his family are catapulted into a breathless adventure with terrifyingly high stakes.

Main cast

Episodes

Series 1

Series 2

Awards & Nominations

International Broadcast
The first series aired on TVNZ in New Zealand in February 2020, BYU TV in the United States in June 2020, CBBC Channel in the United Kingdom in November 2020, in Finnish on Yle in Finland in September 2020 and in Catalan in Super3 in Spain in February 2021. Season 2 began airing on BYUtv's App on 1 January 2022, with an official double episode television premiere on 4 January 2022.
In Canada, the show airs on WildBrainTV.

References

External links

Australian Broadcasting Corporation original programming
Australian children's television series
2020s teen drama television series
2020 Australian television series debuts
English-language television shows
Television series about teenagers
Television shows set in Australia